Vandame is a French surname. Notable people with the surname include:

Charles Louis Joseph Vandame (born 1928), French Jesuit
Pierre Vandame (1913–1993), French field hockey player

See also
Vandamme

French-language surnames